The Speicherstadt (literally: 'City of Warehouses', meaning warehouse district) in Hamburg, Germany is the largest warehouse district in the world where the buildings stand on timber-pile foundations, oak logs, in this particular case. It is located in the port of Hamburg—within the HafenCity quarter—and was built from 1883 to 1927.

The district was built as a free zone to transfer goods without paying customs. The district and the surrounding area have been under redevelopment for many years as the port industry has evolved. As an exceptional example of Neo-Gothic and modernist architecture, and for its testimony to the development of international maritime trade, the Speicherstadt was awarded the status of UNESCO World Heritage Site on 5 July 2015, along with the Kontorhaus District.

Geography

The Speicherstadt is located in the port of Hamburg.

History
From 1815, the independent and sovereign city of Hamburg was a member of the German Confederation—the association of Central European states created by the Congress of Vienna—but not member of the German Customs Union.

Following the Austro-Prussian War which established Prussian hegemony in north Germany, Hamburg was obliged to join the North German Federation. However it obtained an opt-out in the form of Article 34 of the North German constitution, which stated that Hamburg and the other Hanseatic cities would remain as free ports outside the Community customs border until they apply for inclusion. Article 34 was carried over into the imperial constitution of 1871, when the south German states joined the federation. However, Hamburg came under great pressure from Berlin to join the Customs Union after 1879, when the latter's external tariff was greatly increased. In 1881 an agreement was signed between Prussian Finance Minister Karl Hermann Bitter and the State Secretary of the imperial Treasury, on the one hand, Hamburg's Plenipotentiary Senators Versmann and O'Swald, and the envoy of the Hanseatic states in Berlin, Dr. Krüger, on the other. Hamburg would join the Customs Union with all its territory,  except a permanent free port district which the agreement specified. For this district, Article 34 would still apply, thus the freedoms of that district could not be abolished or restricted without Hamburg's approval.

In 1883, to clear space for the new port area, the demolition of the Kehrwieder and Wandrahm area began and more than 20,000 people needed to be relocated. The construction was completed before the start of World War I, managed by the Freihafen-Lagerhaus-Gesellschaft (the predecessor of the Hamburger Hafen und Logistik AG), which was also responsible for the subsequent operation.

After the destruction of about half of the buildings in Operation Gomorrah by bombing during World War II, the conservative rebuilding was finished in 1967, while the Hanseatic Trade Center now occupies the sites of the completely destroyed structures. In 1991 it was listed as a protected Hamburg heritage site. Since 2008, it has been part of the HafenCity quarter. In an attempt to revitalize the inner city area, the Hamburg government initiated the development of the HafenCity area, for example with the construction of the Elbe Philharmonic Hall.

Architecture

The warehouses were built with different support structures, but Franz Andreas Meyer created a Neo-Gothic red-brick outer layer with little towers, alcoves, and glazed terra cotta ornaments. The warehouses are multi-storey buildings with entrances from water and land. One of the oldest warehouses is the Kaispeicher B of the International Maritime Museum.

Use
The Speicherstadt is a major tourist attraction in Hamburg and is the focus of most of the harbor tours. The Afghan Museum was also located here, but closed in 2012.

The buildings are also used as warehouses. As of 2005, the companies in the Speicherstadt handled one-third of the world's carpet production, and other goods including cocoa, coffee, tea, spices, maritime equipment, and electronics.

See also

Mortzenhaus

References

Bibliography
 
 
  A historical detective story.

External links
 Speicherstadt and Kontorhaus District with Chilehaus : UNESCO Official Website

World Heritage Sites in Germany
Zones of Hamburg
Buildings and structures in Hamburg-Mitte
Geography of Hamburg
Heritage sites in Hamburg
Redeveloped ports and waterfronts in Germany
Warehouse districts
Tourist attractions in Hamburg
1888 establishments in Germany
Office buildings in Germany
Free ports